Gurucharan College, popularly known as GC College, recently upgraded to a State University under Assam Government, is a college imparting 10+2, undergraduate, certifications (self-financing) and postgraduate (self-financing) education under the aegis of Assam Higher Secondary Education Council, Guwahati and Assam University, Silchar.

Gurucharan College, Silchar is affiliated under Assam University (Central University).

One of the most popular and having strength of 5000 students, this institution is the primary educational institution for the students of South Assam, Tripura, Mizoram and Manipur. 

Guru Charan College was established in the year 1935 to uplift Women Education primarily.

History
Gurucharan College, Silchar, abbreviated as G.C. College, was established on 15 July 1935. Originally the college was housed in a deserted bungalow of Promode Chandra Dutta at Rangpur on the bank of river Barak. Unfortunately, riverbank erosion began to engulf the college premises, and Gurucharan College was shifted temporarily to the campus of Silchar Normal School.

Initially, the college had been affiliated to Calcutta University. In 1949, the college got affiliated to the Gauhati University. With the establishment of the Assam University (Central), Silchar, G.C. College has been affiliated to it since 1994. It is listed under 2(F) and 12 (B) by the University Grants Commission (UGC) and offers higher secondary (10+2) and three-year degree course (1+1+1) in its Arts, Science and Commerce streams.

Status
The institute is listed under 2(F) and 12 (B) by the University Grants Commission (UGC). It was accredited by NAAC during 2016 and graded as A. The college also achieved the status of College with Potential for Excellence from UGC in the same year.

Academics

Higher secondary courses
In two-year higher secondary courses in Arts, Science and Commerce with two core subjects (English and any one MIL Bengali/Assamese/Manipuri/Hindi or alternative English (in lieu of MIL)), three elective subjects are offered.

Degree courses (TDC)
In the three-year course for the degrees of Bachelor of Arts (BA), Bachelor of Business Administration (BBA), Bachelor of Science (BSc.) and Bachelor of Commerce (B.Com) pass and honours combinations are offered.

Postgraduate courses (self-financing)
Postgraduate studies in Political Science, Economics, Bengali, History, English, Mathematics, Philosophy, Commerce are offered.

Certificate, diploma and advance diploma courses (self-financing)
Certificate, diploma and advance diplomas are available in Travel & Tourism Management, Insurance Business, Entrepreneurship Development.
The English Department of the college is one of the first departments in entire North East India to offer a one-year Diploma in Creative Writing in English.

Notable alumni

 Nihar Ranjan Laskar
 Bir Radha Sherpa - Indian Dancer
 Nurul Huda
 Santosh Mohan Dev
 Kabindra Purkayastha
 B. B. Bhattacharya
 Dilip Kumar Paul
 Kalika Prasad Bhattacharya
 K M Baharul Islam, Dean (Academics), Indian Institute of Management Kashipur (Uttarakhand)

References

External links
Website of the college

Educational institutions established in 1935
Universities and colleges in Assam
Silchar
1935 establishments in India
Colleges affiliated to Assam University